The Liuxihe Dam is an arch dam on the Liuxi River in Conghua District, Guangzhou, Guangdong Province, China. The main purpose of the project is hydroelectric power generation with additional purposes of flood control and irrigation.

Construction
In September 1955, planning for dams in the Liuxi River basin began and by January 1956, plans for the Liuxihe Dam were complete. In August 1956, construction on the dam began and excavation commenced the next month and continued until April 1957, removing  of rock and material. The same month that excavation was complete, concrete placement began and continued until September 1958. Earlier in August, the first generator was placed online and the rest were operational by the end of 1958. Originally, the dam supported 4 × 10.5 MW generators but in 1993, they were upgraded to 12 MW each.

Design

An axillary dam was built in conjunction with the project in order to protect low-lying areas from the reservoir. After the completion of the Huanglongdai Dam in June 1975, the downstream side of the auxiliary dam is now the Huanglongdai Reservoir in which it now serves to regulate both.

See also 

 List of power stations in China

References

Hydroelectric power stations in Guangdong
Dams in China
Arch dams
Dams completed in 1958
1958 establishments in China
Energy infrastructure completed in 1958